Atractus collaris, the collared ground snake, is a species of snake in the family Colubridae. The species can be found in Colombia, Peru, Ecuador, and Brazil.

References 

Atractus
Reptiles of Colombia
Reptiles of Peru
Reptiles of Ecuador
Reptiles of Brazil
Snakes of South America
Reptiles described in 1897
Taxa named by Mario Giacinto Peracca